Victor Correia (born 12 January 1985) is a Guinean former professional footballer who played as a secondary striker. He made four appearances scoring once for the Guinea national team between 2005 and 2008.

Career
Correia was born in Bissau, Guinea-Bissau.

Correia was signed by Lausanne-Sport in summer 2006, but released in mid-season.

He was selected for the Guinea national team at the 2008 African Cup of Nations.

Career statistics

International goals
Scores and results list Guinea's goal tally first, score column indicates score after each Correia goal.

References

External links
 

Living people
1985 births
Sportspeople from Conakry
Association football forwards
Guinean footballers
Belgian Pro League players
UAE First Division League players
Qatari Second Division players
Fello Star players
Satellite FC players
K.S.C. Lokeren Oost-Vlaanderen players
AS Cherbourg Football players
RC Strasbourg Alsace players
FC Lausanne-Sport players
UJA Maccabi Paris Métropole players
Al-Shamal SC players
Dibba Al-Hisn Sports Club players
Guinea international footballers
2008 Africa Cup of Nations players
Guinean expatriate footballers
Guinean expatriate sportspeople in France
Expatriate footballers in France
Guinean expatriate sportspeople in Belgium
Expatriate footballers in Belgium